Kevin McNulty (born December 8, 1955) is a Canadian actor best known for his roles in Ernest Goes to School, Timecop, Fantastic Four, Snakes on a Plane, Fantastic Four: Rise of the Silver Surfer, and as Mel Ivarson on rural airline drama series Arctic Air.

Biography 
His appearance in science fiction films and television productions has been prolific. McNulty grew up in Rossland, British Columbia. He studied music and acting at Washington State University and graduated from Studio 58, Langara College in Vancouver, British Columbia. He put his acting skills to work first on stage, working for two years from 1984 to 1985 at the Stratford Festival. In 1986, McNulty made his break in screen work. Since that time, he continued on an extensive track of television and film work.

Filmography

Film

Television

Awards and nominations
In 2013 McNulty was nominated for a Leo Award in the category of Best Lead Performance by a Male: Dramatic Series for his work on Arctic Air, episode "There's Gold In Them Thar Hills".

References

External links

1955 births
Living people
People from Penticton
Canadian male stage actors
Canadian male film actors
Canadian male television actors
Male actors from British Columbia
Studio 58 people